Geoglyar may refer to:
Göylər Çöl, Azerbaijan
Göylərdağ, Azerbaijan